Inferuncus stoltzei is a moth of the family Pterophoridae that is known from Tanzania.

References

Platyptiliini
Moths described in 1990
Endemic fauna of Tanzania
Insects of Tanzania
Moths of Africa